This is a list of compositions by Frederic Rzewski.

Stage 

 The Persians (1985)
 The Triumph of Death (1987–88)

Orchestral 

 Nature Morte, for small orchestra (1964)
 A Long Time Man, for piano and orchestra (1979)
 Satyrica, for guitar, double bass, piano, synthesizer, vibraphone, percussion, and symphony band (1983)
 Una Breve Storia d'Estate, for three flutes and orchestra (1983)
 Scratch Symphony (1997)
 Movable Types (1999)
 Bring Them Home!, for two percussion, two pianos and orchestra (2004), arranged for two percussion and two pianos
 Piano Concerto, for piano and orchestra (2013)
 A Dog's Life, for piano and orchestra (2014)

Chamber 

 String Quartet (1955)
 Trio, for flute, trumpet and piano (1956)
 Pfi, for 2 flutes, percussion, cello and piano (1963)
 Speculum Dianae, for any eight improvisational players (1964)
 Prose Pieces, for improvisational ensemble (1967–68)
 Les Moutons de Panurge, for any number of melody instruments (1968)
 Last Judgment, for trombone or any number of unison trombones (1969)
 Second Structure, for improvisational ensemble (1972)
 Song and Dance, for flute, bass clarinet, double bass and vibraphone (1976)
 Thirteen Instrumental Studies, for a variable ensemble (1972–77)
 Moonrise with Memories, for bass trombone and ensemble (1978)
 Three Pieces, for soprano saxophone, trombone and piano (1978-81)
 Wails, for bass clarinet, piano and two percussion (1984)
 Spots, for any four players (1986)
 Don't Have it Today, for any player and double bass (1986)
 The Lost Melody, for clarinet, piano and two percussion (1989)
 Roses, for flute, clarinet, trumpet, tuba, violin, cello, accordion and percussion (1989)
 Aerial Tarts, for flute, clarinet, violin, cello, piano and two percussion (1990)
 Whangdoodles, for hammer dulcimer, violin and piano (1990)
 Holes, for any four to eight players (1993)
 Crusoe, for any four to twelve players (1993)
 Histories, for four saxophones (1993)
 Whimwhams, for marimba and string quartet (1993)
 Family Scenes, for flute, three saxophones, French horn, three trumpets, two trombones, bass trombone, double bass and piano (1995)
 When the Wind Blows, for flute, soprano saxophone, tenor saxophone, baritone saxophone, flügelhorn, trombone, guitar, double bass and piano (1996)
 Spiritus, for four recorders and percussion (1997)
 For Hanns, for flute, clarinet, cello and piano (1998)
 Trio, for violin, cello and piano (1998)
 Main Drag, for percussion and eight or more players (1999)
 Cradle Rock, for flute, soprano saxophone, tenor saxophone, baritone saxophone, flügelhorn, trombone, guitar, double bass and piano (1999)
 Pocket Symphony, for flute, clarinet, violin, cello, piano and percussion (2000)
 96, for five players (2003)
 Bring Them Home!, for two percussion and two pianos (2004), arranged from two percussion, two pianos and orchestra version
 Fortune, for four speaking violists (2005)
 Snaps, for piano and string quartet (2005)
 Spoils, for various instrumentations (2005)
 Natural Things, for clarinet, saxophone, 2 percussion, violin, cello and piano (2007)
 Knight, Death, and Devil, for alto flute, bass clarinet, percussion, three violins, viola, two cellos and piano (2007-08)
 Blah!, for eight wind players (2009)
 Flowers 2, for alto saxophone, xylophone and piano (2009)
 Reeds, for oboe, clarinet, bass clarinet, alto saxophone and bassoon (2009)
 Brussels Diary, for flute, clarinet, violin, cello and piano (2010)
 Hard Cuts, for piano and ensemble (2011)
 16 Sneakers, for several violas (2012), or for viola
 Notasonata, for violin and piano (2015)
 Satires, for violin and piano (2015)
 Demons, for violin and piano (2017)
 Words, for string quartet (2018)

Instrumental  

 Selfportrait, for any player (1964)
 Last Judgement, for trombone (1969)
 Aria, for flute (1981)
 Pennywhistlers, for recorder (1981)
 Lost and Found, for speaking percussionist (1985)
 To the Earth, for speaking percussionist (1985)
 Shtick, for clarinet (1990)
 Knight, for cello (1992)
 Honk, for tuba (2004)
 Mollitude, for flute (2006)
 Fall of the Empire, for solo percussionist, spoken word and multi percussion (2007)
 16 Sneakers, for violas (2012), or for several viola

Choral 

 Requiem, Part 1, for speaker, male chorus, Jew's harp, piano, organ, tubular bells, bull-roarer, woodblock, and radio (1963–67)
 Struggle Song, for mixed chorus (1973)
 Le silence des Espaces Infinis, for female chorus, any player, seven orchestral groups, and tape (1980)
 Stop the War!, for mixed chorus (1995)
 Stop the Testing!, for mixed chorus (1995)
 Ode to the Deserter, for mixed chorus and accompaniment (2013)

Vocal 

 Jefferson, for voice and piano (1970)
 Freud, for voice (1970)
 Coming Together, for speaker and variable ensemble (1971)
 Attica, for speaker and variable ensemble (1972)
 Struggle Song, for voice and variable ensemble (1973)
 Nothing Changes, for voice and piano (1976)
 The Price of Oil, for two voices, eight amplified pipe ensembles and any two similar ensembles (1980)
 Snacks, for voice, mixed chorus ad libitum, and any ensemble ad libitum (1981)
 Antigone-Legend, for voice and piano (1982)
 Egyptian Songs, for voice and piano (1982)
 Songs, for voice and piano (1973–83)
 The Liar, for voice and piano (1983)
 Mayakovsky, for speaker, piano, and string quartet (1984)
 Mary's Dream, for soprano, contrabass clarinet, cello, piano, and percussion (1984)
 Force, for two speakers, any two wind instruments, any two plucked instruments, two noisemakers and weigher ad libitum (1985)
 Chains, for speaker and 3 - 4 players (1986)
 Love Song, for voice and any player (1987)
 The Waves, for speaker and variable ensemble (1988)
 Tinkleberries, for voice and any number of players (1980–90)
 The Burghers of Rostock, for voice and piano (1992)
 The Love of Money, for voice and piano (1993)
 Snippets No. 1, for speaker and piano (1994)
 Logique, for voice, flute, cello, and piano (1997)
 Happy Birthday, for voice (1999)
 No More War, for eight voices (2005)
 Snippets No. 2, for speaker and piano (1994-2006)

Piano 

 Chain of Thought (1953)
 Tabakrauch (1954)
 Preludes (1957)
 Poem (1958)
 Introduction and Sonata, for two pianos (1959)
 Study I (1961)
 Study II (1961)
 Falling Music (1971)
 No Place to Go but around (1974)
 36 Variations on 'The People United Will Never Be Defeated!' (1975)
 Four Pieces (1977)
 Squares (1978)
 North American Ballads (1978–79)
 Dreadful Memories
 Which Side are You on?
 Down by the Riverside
 Winnsboro Cotton Mill Blues, also for two pianos (1980)
 The Housewife's Lament, (originally for harpsichord rewritten for piano) (1980)
 A Machine, for two pianos (1984)
 Eggs (1986)
 Steptangle (1986)
 The Turtle and the Crane (1988)
 Mayn Yingele (1988)
 To His Coy Mistress, for singing or speaking pianist (1988)
 Fantasia (1989)
 Bumps (1990)
 Ludes (1990–91)
 Sonata (1991)
 De Profundis (1991–92)
 Andante con Moto (1992)
 A Life (1992)
 Night Crossing with Fisherman, for two pianos (1994)
 Fougues (1994)
 It Makes A Long Time Man Feel Bad, Ballade No.5 (1997, revised 2004, adapted from A Long Time Man)
 Michael Bakunin, Rentier, for speaking pianist (2000)
 When the Wind Blows, for two pianos (1996-2002)
 The Road (1995–2003)
 Turns (1995)
 Tracks (1996)
 Tramps (1997)
 Stops (1998)
 A Few (1999)
 Travelling with Children (1999)
 Final Preparations (1999–2002)
 The Big Day Arrives (2002–03)
 Johnny Has Gone for a Soldier (2003)
 Cadenza (2003), for Piano Concerto No.4, Op.58 by Beethoven
 Dust (2003)
 Spells (2004)
 Second Hand, for piano left hand (2005)
 Rubinstein in Berlin, for speaking pianist (2008)
 10 War Songs (2008)
 Flowers 1, for speaking pianist (2009)
 Nanosonatas (2006-10)
 Etude (2010)
 3 Piano Pieces (2011)
 Dear Diary, for speaking pianist (2014)
 Winter Nights (2014)
 Dreams, Part I (2014)
 Dreams, Part II (2015)
 Songs of Insurrection (2016)
 Saints and Sinners (2016)
 Ages (2017)
 8 Nocturnes (2017)
 6 Movements (2019)
 America: A Poem (2020)
 The Naked Truth (2021)

Other 

 Zoologischer Garten, for tape (1965)

Rzewski, Frederic